Sunrise is the third solo album by Brazilian percussionist Paulinho da Costa released in 1984, recorded for Pablo Records.

Track listing
"Taj Mahal" (Jorge Ben Jor) – 3:45
"I’m Going to Rio" (Clarence Charles) – 4:05
"African Sunrise" (Clarence Charles) – 3:40
"Walkman" (Paulinho Da Costa, Eric Bulling) – 4:35
"O Mar É Meu Chão" (Dori Caymmi, Nelson Motta) – 2:45
"You Came Into My Life" (Clarence Charles, Dave Iwataki) – 3:28
"My Love" (Paulinho Da Costa, Clarence Charles) – 4:42
"You've Got A Special Kind Of Love" (Clarence Charles) – 5:09
"Carioca" (Paulinho Da Costa, Clarence Charles) – 4:55
"Groove" (Paulinho Da Costa, Clarence Charles) – 4:01

Personnel
Paulinho Da Costa - percussion, vocals, Prophet V (B5)
Randy Waldman - piano, keyboards
Nathan East, Abraham Laboriel - bass
George Duke - Moog bass, Clavinet, melodion
John Robinson, Leon "Ndugu" Chancler - drums
Todd Cochrane - piano, vocals
Ernie Watts - flute, saxophone
Larry Carlton, Charles Fearing - guitars 
Clarence Charles - guitars (all tracks, acoustic solo on A4), additional/backing vocals (B1, B2, B4)
Erich Bulling - horn arrangements
Jerry Hey - trumpet, horn arrangements, flugelhorn
Chuck Findley, Bill Reichenbach Jr., Eric Culver, Dick Hyde - trombone
Gary Grant, Steve Madaio - trumpet
Craig Harris - vocoder
Carl Carwell - lead vocals (A1, A3, B2), additional/backing vocals (A1, A3, B1, B2, B4))
Judith Jones, C. Winston Ford, Jr., Roy Galloway, Arthur Hutchinson - backing vocals

Production
Paulinho Da Costa - Producer
Allen Sides - Engineer
Steve Crammel, Tony Chiappa, Bobby Macias, David Egerton - Assistant Engineer
Rik Pekkonen - Mixing
Jim Britt - Photography

References

External links
Paulinho Da Costa at Concord Records
Sunrise at Discogs

1984 albums
Pablo Records albums
Paulinho da Costa albums